Quiet Now is an album by jazz pianist Bill Evans, recorded in 1969. It was released in 1981 on the Affinity label. The same recordings were officially released in 2021 in cooperation with the Bill Evans estate as part of the album Behind The Dikes.

In 1999, Polygram issued a compilation titled Quiet Now: Never Let Me Go which, aside from the title track, has a completely different track listing.

Track listing
 "Very Airy" (Evans) - 5:11
 "A Sleepin' Bee" (Harold Arlen, Truman Capote) - 4:49
 "Quiet Now" (Denny Zeitlin) - 5:26
 "Turn Out the Stars" (Evans) - 4:56
 "Autumn Leaves" (Jacques Prévert, Joseph Kosma, Johnny Mercer) - 4:18
 "Nardis" (Miles Davis) - 5:48

Credits
Bill Evans - piano
Eddie Gómez – bass
Marty Morell – drums

Discography

References

Bill Evans live albums
1970 live albums
Charly Records live albums